Upa Rokamlova (30 May 1941 – 1 July 2020) was an Indian National Congress politician from Mizoram. He was a Speaker of the Mizoram Legislative Assembly from 1990 to 1993. He was admitted to the Ebenezer Medical Centre in Aizawl on May 12, suffering from a kidney disorder. He died on July 1, aged 79.

Career 
He entered politics in the early 1980s after he left his position as Principal of Government Aizawl College and was instrumental in the signing of the historic Mizoram Peace Accord in 1986. He won the state assembly elections three times between 1984 and 1993. He also served as rural development and transport minister in Lal Thanhawla's government. He left politics in 1994.

References 

Indian National Congress politicians from Mizoram
People from Aizawl
Speakers of the Mizoram Legislative Assembly
1941 births
2020 deaths
Mizoram MLAs 1984–1987
Mizoram MLAs 1987–1989
Mizoram MLAs 1989–1993